Sedum perezdelarosae is a species in the genus Sedum.

References

perezdelarosae